Naalai ( Tomorrow) is a 2006 Indian Tamil language film directed by Udhayabhanu Maheswaran and produced by Nallamuthu. The film stars Richard Rishi, Natarajan Subramaniam, Madhumitha, and Nassar.  The music was composed by Karthik Raja, and the film released on 16 June 2006. Singapore actor Sivakumar debuted in this movie for a guest appearance.

Plot
The film starts with Justin (Richard Rishi) getting released from jail while his friend Natty (Natarajan Subramaniam) is waiting for him. A writer who witnesses this decided to write a biography on them. Justin and Natty are friends since childhood. They first met during the death of their respective parents. Both work as henchmen to Nair (Nassar). They are his loyal servants and are prepared to lay their lives for him. However, a sequence of events results in Nair developing mistrust and hatred on the two. He employs another youth, Adi (Aditya Srivastav), in their place and plans to bump them off. Eventually, Justin ends up in prison, and Nattu loses his leg thanks to Nair's plans. After three years (when Justin completes his jail term), Justin, along with Natty, decides to stay away from violence and lead a peaceful life. Charu (Madhumitha), a girl-next-door, falls in love with Justin, and both decide to marry. Meanwhile, a reformed Nair seeks an apology to both Natty and Justin before his death. However, when things go smooth in their lives, a previous enmity leaves Nair's henchmen making an attempt on Justin's life, which eventually claims Charu's life. In the climax, Justin stabs Aditya, while Justin himself gets stabbed and dies. The film ends with Natty carrying Justin and both jumping into the sea and dying.

Cast

Richard Rishi as Justin
Natarajan Subramaniam as Natty
Madhumitha as Charu
Nassar as Nair
Aditya Srivastava as Adi
Bala Singh as Kothandam
Mahanadhi Shankar
Sembi as Bose
Dhandapani as Thanikai
Ilavarasu
Suja Varunee
Nirosha
Manobala
Bose Venkat as a cop
Edvin Nathan
Sivakumar Palakrishnan

Production
The film has been produced by internationally renowned documentary filmmaker and cinematographer S. Nallamuthu. The story has been written and directed by Udayabanu Maheshwaran, eminent story and screenplay writer from mainstream Hindi cinema. G. Ramesh is the cinematographer, Karthik Raja the music director, lyrics by Na. Muthukumar, art direction by S. Maniraj, stunts by Super Subbarayan and choreography by Shanti Srihari.

Soundtrack 
Songs by Karthik Raja and lyrics written by Na. Muthukumar.
"Kattabomman" - Tippu
"Naalai Indha Kaalam" - Karthik
"Arai Adi Thoorathil" - Rita, Ranjith, Tippu
"Idi Mayalogam" - Malgudi Subha, Tippu, Ranjith
"Oru Mattram" - Karthik

Critical reception
Sify wrote that "Naalai is not a classic gangster movie, still the team has to be encouraged. It’s just ok and one of the better gangster movies we have seen in recent times.". Rediff wrote:"The absence of an original story line and a weak screenplay takes the sheen out of the film. On the whole, it is a film with a lot of gloss and stale content". The Hindu said that "Rarely do you get to witness a short, succinctly told narrative on screen".

References

External links

2006 films
2000s Tamil-language films
Films scored by Karthik Raja